"Heart Vacancy" is a song by British boy band the Wanted from their self-titled debut album. It was released as the album's second single in the United Kingdom on 17 October 2010 through Geffen Records. The song was written by Jonas Jeberg, Cutfather, Lucas Secon, and Wayne Hector. "Heart Vacancy" was originally written for English singer Leona Lewis, and was given to four different artists before being recorded by the Wanted.

Four years after the band's hiatus in 2014, Tom Parker, Max George and Jay McGuiness performed the song as a three piece at Parker's wedding to his fiancé Kelsey in July 2018.

Critical reception
Robert Copsey of Digital Spy gave the song three out of five stars and described it as "a slushy, string-laden slowie about longing for a girl, but with the BPM turned up a notch and a stomping rhythm – too fast for waving lighters but slow enough for hands-in-the-air time – 'Heart Vacancy' treads on the slightly more manly side of sentimental."

Chart performance
"Heart Vacancy" debuted at number two on the UK Singles Chart with first-week sales of 66,394, second only to the Bruno Mars song "Just the Way You Are". In Ireland, the song debuted at peaked at number eighteen. It was re-released as the band's second single in America in April 2012 but did not chart.

Track listing
Digital download
"Heart Vacancy" – 3:42
"Heart Vacancy" (Tonka's Daddycated Radio Edit) – 3:15
"Heart Vacancy" (Tonka's Daddycated Remix) – 5:51
"Heart Vacancy" (DJs from Mars Remix) – 6:15

CD single
"Heart Vacancy" – 3:42
"Kickstarts" (Elliot Gleave, Nicholas Douwma) – 2:58

Promotional CD single
"Heart Vacancy" (Radio Edit) – 3:45
"Heart Vacancy" (Instrumental) – 3:28

Personnel
Songwriting – Mich Hansen, Jonas Jeberg, Lucas Secon, Wayne Hector
Production – Jonas Jeberg, Cutfather
Mixing – Mads Nilsson
Keyboards and programming – Jonas Jeberg
Guitars – Daniel Davidsen
Percussion – Mich Hansen
Vocals – Tom Parker, Nathan Sykes, Jay McGuiness, Max George, Siva Kaneswaran
Mastering – Dick Beetham

Source:

Charts

Weekly charts

Year-end charts

Certifications

Release history

References

External links
"Heart Vacancy" Song Lyrics at TheWantedMusic.com

2010 singles
The Wanted songs
Songs written by Wayne Hector
Songs written by Lucas Secon
Songs written by Cutfather
Songs written by Jonas Jeberg
Pop ballads
Geffen Records singles
2010 songs